is an interchange passenger railway station in located in the city of Yao,  Osaka Prefecture, Japan, operated by the private railway operator Kintetsu Railway.

Lines
Shigisanguchi Station is served by the Shigi Line, and is located  2.8 rail kilometers from the starting point of the line at Kawachi-Yamamoto Station. It is also the terminus for the Kintetsu Nishi-Shigi Cable Line

Station layout
The station consists of two deadheaded opposed side platforms for the Osaka Line and one bay platform for the Nishi-Shigi Cable Line

Platforms

Adjacent stations

History
Shigisanguchi Station opened on December 15, 1930. It was renamed  from July 1, 1948 to March 21, 1957.

Passenger statistics
In fiscal 2018, the station was used by an average of 1380 passengers daily.

Surrounding area
The area around the station is a quiet residential area.

See also
List of railway stations in Japan

References

External links

 Onji Station 

Railway stations in Japan opened in 1930
Railway stations in Osaka Prefecture
Yao, Osaka